Saint-Ouen-l'Aumône is a commune in the northwestern suburbs of Paris, France.

Population

Transport
Saint-Ouen-l'Aumône is served by two interchange stations on Paris RER C line and on the Transilien Paris-Nord suburban rail line: Saint-Ouen-l'Aumône-Liesse and Saint-Ouen-l'Aumône.

Saint-Ouen-l'Aumône is also served by two other stations on the Transilien Paris-Nord suburban rail line: Épluches and Pont-Petit.

Finally, Saint-Ouen-l'Aumône is also served by Saint-Ouen-l'Aumône-Quartier de l'Église station on the Transilien Paris-Saint-Lazare suburban rail line.

Education
Schools in the commune include:
Four sets of preschools (maternelles) and elementary schools: Matisse, Prairie, Jean Effel, Le Nôtre
One combined preschool and elementary school, Ecole Prévert
Three primary school groups: De Liesse, Des Borseaux, and Jean-Jacques Rousseau
Two junior high schools: Collège et SEGPA Marcel Pagnol and Collège Le Parc
Three senior high schools: Lycée polyvalent Edmond Rostand, Lycée technique Jean Perrin, and Lycée des métiers de l’automobile et du transport du Château d’Épluches

See also
Communes of the Val-d'Oise department

References

External links

Official website 

Association of Mayors of the Val d'Oise 

Communes of Val-d'Oise
Cergy-Pontoise